Matias Fonseca may refer to:

 Matías Fonseca (footballer, born 1995), Argentine football forward
 Matias Fonseca (footballer, born 2001), Italian football forward for Montevideo Wanderers